Berryessa Station may refer to:

Berryessa/North San Jose station, a BART heavy rail station in California
Berryessa station (VTA), a VTA light rail station in California